Acraea stenobea, the suffused acraea, is a butterfly of the family Nymphalidae. It is found in Namibia, Botswana, Zimbabwe, Transvaal and the Free State.

Description

The wingspan is 48–55 mm for males and 50–56 mm for females.
A. stenobea Wallengr. ( = acronycta Westw.). male Both wings above broadly darkened with black-brown from the base to the middle or often to the apex of the cell; upperside of the forewing only with black marginal line or apical spot; the veins not darkened at the distal margin; that of the hindwing with unspotted, almost entire-margined black marginal band 2 mm. in breadth; ground-colour of the upper surface light brown- yellow, occasionally somewhat reddish. Under surface lighter yellow, at the base of the hindwing reddish; marginal band of the hind wing with large light marginal spots; discal dots of both wings rather large, those in cellules 3 to 5 of the hindwing often absent; the dots in cellules 4 to 6 of the forewing touch one another and are placed rather far beyond the apex of the cell. The female (55 c; = lygus Druce [ now species Acraea lygus ]) only differs from the male in the somewhat darker ground-colour of the upper surface, the broader marginal band of the hindwing, a more or less extended white shade in the middle of the hindwing and often also in the broader scaling at the base. South Africa to Angola and German East Africa.

Biology
Adults are on wing year-round in warm areas, with peaks in September and from March to May.

Taxonomy
It is a member of the Acraea caecilia species group. See also Pierre & Bernaud, 2014.

References

External links

Acraea stenobia Le Site des Acraea de Dominique Bernaud
Acraea stenobea Holotype images Swedish Museum of Natural History

stenobea
Butterflies described in 1860
Butterflies of Africa
Taxa named by Hans Daniel Johan Wallengren